Malaury Martin (born 25 August 1988) is a French former professional footballer who played as a midfielder.

Martin started his career with Ligue 1 side AS Monaco. He has since played for Nîmes, English clubs Blackpool and Middlesbrough, Swiss club Lausanne-Sport, Norwegian clubs Sandnes Ulf and Lillestrøm and Scottish clubs Hearts and Dunfermline.

Martin has played for France at six levels – under-15, under-16, under-17, under-18, under-19 and under-21. He played 47 games and scored 5 goals with the French youth teams, and was the captain from under-17 to under-21.

Club career

AS Monaco
Martin, born in Nice, joined the Youth Teams of AS Monaco in 2000 and made his debut for Monaco in the 2005–06 Ligue 1 season, playing one game that year – a 2–2 draw with Nancy on 13 May 2006. Captain of the Reserve Team of AS Monaco, he was French Champion of Professional Reserve Teams in 2007/2008. He made eight appearances with the first team of AS Monaco in the 2007–08 season.

He was loaned out in the 2008–09 season to Ligue 2 side Nîmes Olympique. He made his debut on 12 September in a 1–0 home loss to Tours. He made a total of 14 appearances as Nîmes escaped relegation to the Championnat National by one point.

After his loan spell and return to Monaco, manager Guy Lacombe placed him in the reserves. In June 2010, Martyin went on trial at Major League Soccer side Chicago Fire and English Championship side Blackpool. It was announced on 29 July 2010 that his contract with the club had been terminated, with two years left on his contract.

Blackpool
In July 2010 he went on trial with newly promoted English Premier League side Blackpool, traveling with the squad to Devon to compete in the South West Challenge Cup pre-season tournament. And in the Seasiders first game in the competition on 20 July, a 2–1 win over Accrington Stanley, he was named "Man of the Match". On 11 August, Martin signed a one-year contract with Blackpool; however, he failed to feature in the 2010–11 season. At the end of the same season he was released by Blackpool.

Middlesbrough
On 30 June 2011, Martin went on trial with Championship club Middlesbrough. He signed a one-year contract on 18 July. He made his competitive Middlesbrough debut against Leeds United in a 1–0 victory on 13 August 2011. He scored his first Middlesbrough goal in a 3–1 win over Birmingham City on 21 August 2011. Martin scored his second Boro goal of his Boro career on 3 December 2011, scoring a free-kick in the 90th minute in Middlesbrough's 1–0 win over Bristol City.

Martin scored his 3rd goal on 24 March 2012, scoring a powerful shot from outside the area in a 1–1 draw against Bristol City. After the match, Bristol City manager Derek McInnes claimed Martin had changed the game and described his goal as a "fantastic strike". Martin believed his performance gave him a chance to stay in the first team. At the end of the 2011–12 season, Martin was offered a new contract with the club. The proposed contract was not signed and the existing contract ended by 1 July 2012. After his release from Middlesbrough, Martin went on trial with Championship rivals Barnsley.

Lausanne-Sport
On 18 February 2013, Martin joined Swiss outfit Lausanne-Sport on a six-month deal. On 3 March 2013, Martin made his debut for the club, in a 1–1 draw against Grasshopper and on 3 May 2013, Martin scored his first goal for the club, in a 1–1 draw against Zürich. At the end of the season and after 12 games, he refused to sign a new contract.

Norway
After leaving Switzerland, Martin moved to Norwegian Tippeligaen club Sandnes on a two-year contract until 2015.

On 1 August 2015, Martin signed a one and half year contract with Lillestrøm, tying him to the club until the end of 2016. He left the club when his contract expired on 1 January 2017.

Hearts
Martin signed a 3.5 year contract with Scottish Premiership club Hearts in January 2017. He made his debut for Hearts on 22 January 2017, against Raith Rovers in the Scottish Cup. Martin fell out of favour at Hearts after Craig Levein became manager in August 2017, and he was loaned to Dunfermline Athletic for part of the 2018–19 season. In January 2019 he agreed to shorten his contract with Hearts to November 2019 in order to facilitate a transfer, but this move did not materialise. Martin left Hearts by mutual consent in June 2019.

Palermo
In August 2019 he joined Palermo's training camp on trial.

After impressing on his trial period, he was awarded a new contract which he signed on his birthday, 25 August 2019. He won promotion to Serie C with the Rosanero and was confirmed for the club's 2020–21 Serie C season, where he played sporadically. He left Palermo by the end of the 2020–21 season following his contract expiration.

Casale and retirement
On 26 August 2021, Italian Serie D club Casale announced the signing of Martin as a free transfer. He left Casale by the end of the season.

On 11 October 2022, Martin announced his retirement from active football.

International career
Martin captained France at every level from under-17s to under-21s. He played a total of 47 representative games and scored 5 goals. In the 2007 UEFA European Under-19 Football Championship, held in Austria, Martin scored two goals in the 5–2 group stage victory over Serbia, as the French reached the semi-finals. He was picked out on the UEFA website as being a "name to note" for the future, after his performances (2 goals and 3 assists) for France under-19s at the 2007 UEFA European Under-19 Football Championship, held in Austria, when it was said of him: "Always looks composed on the ball and never seemed to give away possession in the engine room of a French side that at their best were as good as any in the tournament. Equally adept at passing short and long, he is also a free-kick specialist – witness his effort against Serbia."

Career statistics

Club

References

External links

 Monaco Profile
 Malaury Martin Profile at Altomfotball

1988 births
Living people
French footballers
France under-21 international footballers
Association football midfielders
OGC Nice players
AS Monaco FC players
Nîmes Olympique players
Blackpool F.C. players
Middlesbrough F.C. players
FC Lausanne-Sport players
Sandnes Ulf players
Lillestrøm SK players
Heart of Midlothian F.C. players
Palermo F.C. players
Ligue 1 players
Ligue 2 players
English Football League players
Swiss Super League players
Eliteserien players
Scottish Professional Football League players
Norwegian First Division players
French expatriate footballers
Expatriate footballers in Norway
French expatriate sportspeople in Norway
France youth international footballers
Expatriate footballers in England
Expatriate footballers in Scotland
French expatriate sportspeople in England
French expatriate sportspeople in Scotland
Dunfermline Athletic F.C. players